Los Santos de Maimona is a municipality in the province of Badajoz, Extremadura, Spain. It has a population of 8,245 in 2012 and an area of 108 km².

References

Municipalities in the Province of Badajoz